Ole Wilhelm Erichsen (19 February 1793 – 25 July 1860) was the Norwegian Minister of the Navy 1848-1852 and 1853–1856.

Erichson was temporarily appointed councillor of state in interim government in Stockholm 1852–1853, and was member of the Council of State Division 1852–1853. Erichsen was a military captain before his public service career.

References

1793 births
1860 deaths
Government ministers of Norway
Royal Norwegian Navy personnel
Defence ministers of Norway